Dildorado is a Swedish pop/disco band.

History 
Dildorado was established in 2000 by three members Captain, Horny & Misty after their performance in Barcelona. Originally, they were known by the name Los Amigos del Toro. The group's first album was released in 2009. The album included three remixes of Hakan Lidbo's "Sailor boy". It was issued as a limited edition yellow 12-inch vinyl EP. In 2011, Sailor boy joined the group. His first appearance was singing and acting with Ronald McDonald in "I'm lovin' it" video. In 2012 the group release a controversial video, accompanied by a song "Sinners in the sun", in which Sailor boy undressed and teased an orthodox priest. They released a cover of ABBA's song "SOS" in 2013 with its original guitarist Janne Schaffer. The cover was created with permission of ABBA's Benny Andersson. The group's song ”United fruit” was selected as official song of Stockholm Pride in 2015.
In addition to being pride's anthem, the song is a tribute to Stonewall riot.

Band members 
 Michael Westlund as Sailor Boy (2011–present)
 Edwin von Werder as Captain (2000–present)
 Jöns Hellsing as Misty (2000–present)
 Martin Sjögren as Horny (2000–present)

References

External links 
Dildorado in Twitter
Dildorado YouTube channel.

Swedish pop music groups
Swedish LGBT musicians